Jorge Speranza (August 25, 1958, Montevideo, Uruguay) is a former soccer player.
Currently he works as a soccer coach.

As a player, he shared dressing room at Club Atlético Bella Vista with some of the most important coaches of recent Uruguayan history as Víctor Púa, Julio Ribas, Luis González and Oscar Washington Tabarez (current coach of Uruguay's national team).

As a coach, he began coaching professional players in 1989 in Salus F.C. His last team was Club Nacional de Football, in the 2010 season.

Currently, he has no team.

Career 

He started coaching soccer teams at Uruguay's University Soccer League (Liga Universitaria de Fútbol de Uruguay) when he was still taking the coaches’ course at ISEF in Montevideo, in 1988. After he graduated, he coached Salus F.C. for two years.

After that, he coached youngsters at Bella Vista, River Plate and Montevideo Wanderers F.C.

In 1997 Speranza was hired again by Salus F.C. to coach the professional team.

In 2004, he worked for Club Deportivo Colonia and he coached F.C. Itzaes from Mérida (Yucatán, Mexico).

At his last club, Club Nacional de Football from Uruguay, he worked as assistant head coach in the 2010 season.

Managing activity 

In parallel to his sport activity, Speranza has worked in management for companies such as Kodak (México), Bertelsmann AG, Coasin Uruguaya S.A., Acer Uruguay (as General Manager) and Integro IT Group in Uruguay (as General Manager).

References

External links 

Living people
1958 births
Uruguayan footballers
C.A. Bella Vista players
Association footballers not categorized by position